This is a list of members of the 13th Legislative Assembly of Queensland from 1899 to 1902, as elected at the 1899 election held between 1 March 1899 and 25 March 1899 (due to problems of distance and communications, it was not possible to hold the elections on a single day).

See also
Premier:
 Anderson Dawson (Labour) (1899) — 6 days
 Robert Philp (Ministerial) (1899–1903)

Notes
 Edward Barrow Forrest and John Dunmore Campbell, the newly elected Ministerial members for Brisbane North and Moreton, were members of the Marine Board and were claimed to have held an office of profit under the Crown. They therefore resigned their seats to contest them at a by-election, and were returned unopposed on 20 April 1899 (Melbourne Argus, 14 April 1899, p. 6).
 On 6 July 1899, one of the Ministerial members for South Brisbane, Abraham Luya, died. Labour candidate and former member Henry Turley won the resulting by-election on 22 July 1899.
 At the 1899 election, William Hood had been returned by a one-vote majority in Warrego. His sole opponent, Labour candidate David Bowman, filed a petition against his return and on 21 November 1899, the election was declared void. Bowman won the resulting by-election on 16 December 1899 with a majority of 44 votes.
 On 7 December 1899, James Drake, the Opposition member for Enoggera, was appointed to the Queensland Legislative Council. Labour candidate Matthew Reid won the resulting by-election on 23 December 1899.
 Thomas Glassey, elected as the Labour member for Bundaberg, resigned from the party and his seat in 1900. He won the resulting by-election against a Labour opponent on 14 July 1900.
 On 5 October 1900, Thomas Finney, the Ministerial member for Toowong, resigned. Ministerial candidate Edward Macartney won the resulting by-election on 24 November 1900.
 On 10 January 1901, James Dickson, the Ministerial member for Bulimba, died. Ministerial candidate Walter Barnes won the resulting by-election on 16 February 1901.
 On 1 March 1901, John Murray, the Ministerial member of Normanby, resigned. Ministerial candidate George Fox won the resulting by-election on 13 April 1901.
 On 12 April 1901, James Chataway, the Ministerial member for Mackay, died. Ministerial candidate Walter Paget won the resulting by-election on 25 May 1901.

 Federal election

The first federal election was held on 30 March 1901. Unlike later elections, nobody resigned from their seats to contest it, but those who got elected to the federal parliament subsequently resigned their Assembly seats. This triggered a series of by-elections:

 Andrew Fisher, Labour member for Gympie, became the member for the Federal division of Wide Bay, and resigned his Assembly seat on 9 May 1901. Labour candidate Daniel Mulcahy won the resulting by-election on 8 June 1901.
 William Henry Groom, Opposition member for Drayton and Toowoomba, became the member for the Federal division of Darling Downs and resigned his Assembly seat on 4 June 1901. Independent Ministerialist candidate James Tolmie won the resulting by-election on 22 June 1901.
 James Stewart, the Labour member for North Rockhampton, became a Senator for Queensland and resigned his Assembly seat on 5 June 1901. Labour candidate Henry Turner won the resulting by-election on 22 June 1901 with a majority of one vote. This result was set aside upon petition on 17 October 1901 and Independent candidate John Linnett was declared elected without a further by-election.
 Thomas Glassey, the Independent member for Bundaberg, became a Senator for Queensland and resigned his Assembly seat on 22 June 1901. Labour candidate George Barber won the resulting by-election on 6 July 1901.
 Anderson Dawson, the Labour member for Charters Towers, became a Senator for Queensland and resigned his Assembly seat on 11 June 1901. Labour candidate John Burrows won the resulting by-election on 6 July 1901.
 William Higgs, the Labour member for Fortitude Valley, became a Senator for Queensland and resigned his Assembly seat on 17 July 1901. Ministerial candidate John McMaster won the resulting by-election on 27 July 1901.
 Charles McDonald, the Labour member for Flinders, became the member for the Federal division of Kennedy, and resigned his Assembly seat on 24 June 1901. Labour candidate Peter Airey won the resulting by-election on 3 August 1901.
 Thomas Macdonald-Paterson, the Ministerial member for Brisbane North, became the member for the Federal division of Brisbane and resigned his Assembly seat on 31 July 1901. Ministerial candidate John Cameron won the resulting by-election on 6 August 1901.

References

 Waterson, Duncan Bruce: Biographical Register of the Queensland Parliament 1860-1929 (second edition), Sydney 2001.
 

Members of Queensland parliaments by term
20th-century Australian politicians
19th-century Australian politicians